Cyrille Magnier (born 24 September 1969) is a French former professional football defender who played with RC Lens, AJ Auxerre, Amiens SC and Arras FA.

Whilst at Lens, Magnier contributed 26 appearances as his side won 1997–98 French Division 1. The following season he played in the final as they won the 1998-99 Coupe de la Ligue.

References

External links
 
  Player profile at L'Equipe

1969 births
Living people
People from Boulogne-sur-Mer
Sportspeople from Pas-de-Calais
Association football defenders
French footballers
RC Lens players
AJ Auxerre players
Amiens SC players
Arras FA players
Ligue 1 players
Ligue 2 players
Footballers from Hauts-de-France